Piotr Witasik (born 4 December 1992) is a Polish professional footballer who plays as a defender for Kotwica Kołobrzeg.

On 9 August 2020, he was announced the captain of Stal Stalowa Wola for the 2020–21 season. On 15 January 2021, his contract with Stal was terminated. A day later, he rejoined Olimpia Grudziądz.

On 6 July 2022, Witasik signed with II liga side Kotwica Kołobrzeg, joining four Olimpia teammates and manager Marcin Płuska who made the same move during the transfer window.

External links

References

1992 births
Living people
Polish footballers
Association football defenders
Ekstraklasa players
I liga players
II liga players
III liga players
GKS Bełchatów players
Siarka Tarnobrzeg players
Olimpia Grudziądz players
Stal Stalowa Wola players
Kotwica Kołobrzeg footballers
Sportspeople from Bełchatów